Conquer is the fourth album by American R&B singer Carl Thomas. It was released by Verve Forecast on December 6, 2011.

Critical reception

In his review for Allmusic, David Jeffries rated the album three and a half out of five stars. He called the album "in true Thomas fashion, a mixed bag." Comparing it to his previous efforts, Jeffries found that Conquer was more aware of Thomas's "strengths than any release since his  debut [...] Material-starved fans craving his rich, warm, and velvety delivery should ignore all these minor complaints and plunder at will."

Track listing 

Notes and sample credits
 denotes co-producer
 denotes additional producer
"It Ain't Fair" contains a sample from "Seven Samurai: Ending Theme" as performed by Ryuichi Sakamoto.

Charts

Release history

References

2011 albums
Carl Thomas (singer) albums